The Legend of Master So (蘇乞兒) is a TVB television series, premiered on 27 September 1982. Theme song "Forgets With All One's Heart the Sentiment" (忘盡心中情) composition and arrangement by Joseph Koo, lyricist by Wong Jim, sung by Johnny Yip.

Short plot Summary
this TV series set in the 1920s during kuomintang era so chan whom live in the 20th century.

Cast
 Chow Yun-fat as So Chan (蘇燦)
 Andy Lau as Man Tit Ho (萬鐵豪)
 Michael Miu as Ma Kwan (馬坤)
 Michelle Yim as Siu Ling (蕭玲)

1982 Hong Kong television series debuts
1982 Hong Kong television series endings
TVB dramas
Martial arts television series
1980s Hong Kong television series
Cantonese-language television shows